Khalid Al-Dubaysh (born 27 November 1998) is a Saudi professional footballer who plays as a left-back for Al-Ain.

Career
Al-Dubaish started his career with Al-Nassr where he was promoted from the youth team to the first team, On 2017.he joined Al-Shoulla on a season-long loan. On 25 August 2019, Al-Dubaish signed a contract with Al-Adalah. On 2 October, Al-Dubaish signed a contract with Al-Shabab. On 27 January 2022, Al-Dubaysh joined Damac. On 5 September 2022, Al-Dubaysh joined Al-Ain.

References

External links 
 

1998 births
Living people
Sportspeople from Riyadh
Association football fullbacks
Saudi Arabian footballers
Saudi Arabia youth international footballers
Al Nassr FC players
Al-Shoulla FC players
Al-Adalah FC players
Al-Shabab FC (Riyadh) players
Damac FC players
Al-Ain FC (Saudi Arabia) players
Saudi First Division League players
Saudi Professional League players